Néstor Leonel Scotta (7 April 1948 – 8 January 2001) was an Argentine football striker who was twice top scorer in Copa Libertadores.

Néstor Tola Scotta was born in San Justo in 1948, he came from a footballing family, his father played for Colón de San Justo and his elder brother Héctor was an Argentina international and twice topscorer in Argentina.

Scotta began playing football with local side Colón de San Justo. In 1967, he joined Unión de Santa Fe for 600,000 pesos. He played for the club until 1969 when he joined River Plate for 10,000,000 pesos. He played 43 league games for River, scoring 10 goals.

In 1973, he joined Racing Club where he scored 63 goals in 127 league games.

Scotta joined Argentine manager Carlos Bilardo at Colombian side Deportivo Cali in 1977 where he was twice runner up in the Colombian league and runner up in Copa Libertadores 1977. During his time with the club he scored 79 goals in 109 games and was twice top scorer in the Copa Libertadores in 1977 and 1978.

In 1981 Scotta returned to Argentina where he played for Platense scoring 4 goals in 23 appearances. In 1982, he joined Temperley where he helped them secure promotion to the Primera División. In 1983, he was part of the Temperley team that secured their best ever finish in an Argentine championship when they reached the semi-final of the Nacional where they were beaten by eventual champions Estudiantes de La Plata.

Scotta played out the remainder of his career in the lower leagues of Argentine football with  Colón de Santa Fe in 1984, Estudiantes de Buenos Aires in 1985 and Excursionistas in 1986.

Scotta died in a car accident on 8 January 2001 in Caseros, aged 52.

References

External links
 Falleció Néstor Scotta in Clarín
 BDFA profile

People from San Justo Department, Santa Fe
Argentine footballers
Association football forwards
Unión de Santa Fe footballers
Club Atlético River Plate footballers
Racing Club de Avellaneda footballers
Club Atlético Platense footballers
Club Atlético Colón footballers
Deportivo Cali footballers
Estudiantes de Buenos Aires footballers
Argentine Primera División players
Categoría Primera A players
Argentine expatriate footballers
Expatriate footballers in Colombia
Argentine expatriate sportspeople in Colombia
1948 births
2001 deaths
Road incident deaths in Argentina
Sportspeople from Santa Fe Province